Gene Dinwiddie (born Charles Eugene Dinwiddie; September 19, 1936 in Louisville, Kentucky, United States – January 11, 2002 in La Puente, Los Angeles, California, aged 65), was an American blues   saxophonist, who is best known as a member of the Butterfield Blues Band.

Dinwiddie had played since the 1950s in both jazz and blues until, in 1967, the Butterfield Blues Band added a horn section. In this he remained until the band broke up in 1971, and afterwards he was still a member of the Butterfield Band spinoff group, Full Moon.

It also was during the 1960s that he was a member of the James Cotton Blues Band and worked in the 1970s as a session musician, amongst other musicians for, B. B. King, Paul Butterfield, Gregg Allman, Melissa Manchester and Jackie Lomax. In the 1990s, his work as a session musician continued. He can be heard, for example, on Etta James' Stickin' to My Guns (1990).

References

External links
Gene Dinwiddie on Allmusic

A power stronger than itself: the AACM and American experimental music By George Lewis

1936 births
2002 deaths
American blues saxophonists
American session musicians
Musicians from Louisville, Kentucky
20th-century American musicians
Blues musicians from Kentucky
Paul Butterfield Blues Band members